Jiang Lili (born 18 December 1954) is a Chinese actress, best known for starring in numerous films in the 1980s. She currently resides in the U.S., where she also did some projects (e.g. the 2016 short film Kayla's World), but her career focus remains in China.

Her husband Wang Baosheng (汪宝生) appeared in many film with her, although he retired from acting in the 1990s. Her niece Jiang Yuan (姜嫄) is also an actress.

Filmography

Film

TV Series

Awards and nominations

References

80年代当红花旦，主持过春晚，最红时赴美发展，老来俏气质更优雅

External links
 

20th-century Chinese actresses
21st-century Chinese actresses
Actresses from Harbin
Actresses from Shenyang
Beijing Film Academy alumni
Chinese film actresses
Chinese television actresses
1954 births
Living people